Romeo vs Juliet is a 2015 Indo-Bangladesh joint production romantic comedy film directed by Ashok Pati. The cast includes Indian actors Ankush Hazra, Joey Debroy|
and Bangladeshi actress Mahiya Mahi. It is produced by Overseas Films Limited. The film released on 16 January 2015.

Cast 
 Joey Debroy
 Mahiya Mahi
 Ankush Hazra
 Nita Mistry as Anu
 Kabila
 Kharaj Mukherjee
 Supriyo Dutta as Morol
 Ali Raj
 Tulika Basu
 Partho Sarathi Chakraborty
 Tanveer
 Rebecca
 Ujjol Pm
 Lola Williams
 Abigail Hopkins as Desdemona

Soundtrack 

The soundtrack of the film was scored by Savvy Gupta and Akassh Sen.

Reception
A review in The Times of India gave Romeo vs Juliet one star out of five. It praised the beauty of the London locations, but criticized the absurd plot and a cast that "performs like they are part of an open-air jatra performance".

References

External links
 

2015 films
2010s Bengali-language films
2015 romantic comedy films
Bengali-language Indian films
Bengali-language Bangladeshi films
Indian romantic comedy films
Bangladeshi romantic comedy films
Films scored by Savvy Gupta
Films scored by Akassh
Films directed by Ashok Pati
Jaaz Multimedia films